The Museums and Galleries Act 1992 is an Act of the Parliament of the United Kingdom (1992 c. 44) the long title of which is "An Act to establish Boards of Trustees of the National Gallery, the Tate Gallery, the National Portrait Gallery and the Wallace Collection; to transfer property to them and confer functions on them; to make new provision as to transfers to and between the collections of certain museums, galleries and libraries; to make provision for and in connection with the vesting of land in the governing bodies of such institutions; to make provision for the financing of such institutions and of the Museums and Galleries Commission; to make further provision with respect to the giving of indemnities against the loss of, or damage to, objects on loan to certain institutions; to change the name of, and to make further provision with respect to, the British Museum (Natural History); and to amend certain enactments relating to museums, galleries and libraries; and for purposes connected herewith."

This Act legislates the operation and financing of the museums mentioned in its title. For example, it establishes that the National Portrait Gallery is to "maintain a collection of portraits in all media of the most eminent persons in British history from the earliest times to the present day".

The Act repealed the National Gallery and Tate Gallery Act 1954.

References

External links

1992 in London
United Kingdom Acts of Parliament 1992
Acts of the Parliament of the United Kingdom concerning museums
Acts of the Parliament of the United Kingdom concerning London
National Gallery, London
Tate galleries
National Portrait Gallery, London
Wallace Collection